"Hey Bulldog" is a song by the English rock band the Beatles released on their 1969 soundtrack album Yellow Submarine. Credited to Lennon–McCartney, but written primarily by John Lennon, it was finished in the recording studio by both Lennon and Paul McCartney. The song was recorded during the filming of the "Lady Madonna" promotional film, and, with "Lady Madonna", is one of the few Beatles songs based on a piano riff.

It had a working title of "She Can Talk To Me". For many years, "Hey Bulldog" was a relatively obscure and overlooked song in the Beatles' catalogue; it has since been reappraised by fans and a number of critics and musicians as one of the band's best rock songs.

Background and composition 

John Lennon began composing "Hey Bulldog", originally "Hey Bullfrog", after United Artists requested another song by the Beatles for Yellow Submarine, the upcoming soundtrack album for their animated film of the same name. Demo recordings made in the winter of 1967–68 at his Kenwood estate in Weybridge include the melody that later became the song's chorus, as well as a section working out the "she can talk to me" passage.

The finished composition of "Hey Bulldog" is in common time (4/4) and employs a shifting key, changing between B major, A major and B minor. Commentators have variously described the song as hard rock, blues-based rock, psychedelic rock, pop rock, acid rock or a simple rock number. In a beginning reminiscent of the Beatles' cover of Barrett Strong's "Money (That's What I Want)", the song's opening piano riff is played in octaves before being doubled in a higher register by two guitars and a lower bass register. The song includes two bridges and two middle verses, with the bridge closer in style to a refrain. The song's introductory riff repeats throughout the song, appearing at the end of the refrain and the outro, as well as further influencing the refrain. The song's lyrics utilize heavy word play, which Lennon later said "[mean] nothing".

Recording 

The Beatles went to EMI's Studio Three on 11 February 1968 to record a promotional film for "Lady Madonna", but decided upon arrival to record a new song instead. Lennon suggested his half-completed idea "Hey Bullfrog", which he and Paul McCartney finished while in the studio. McCartney later recalled misreading Lennon's handwritten lyrics, changing "measured out in news" to "measured out in you", which Lennon preferred to the original.

George Martin produced the session, assisted by balance engineer Geoff Emerick. The camera crew remained in the studio with the band as they recorded the basic track, featuring piano, drums, tambourine, bass guitar and rhythm guitar. As the band neared the end of the basic track for "Hey Bulldog", McCartney attempted to make Lennon laugh by barking like a dog. Lennon changed the song's name to "Hey Bulldog", though the title phrase does not appear until the outro.

After the band had recorded ten takes, the last attempt was marked "best". The camera crew left as the band continued working on the song with various overdubs onto take ten, including off-beat drums from Ringo Starr, a distorted Gibson SG from George Harrison for the song's intro, double tracked vocals from Lennon and a harmony vocal from McCartney. Borrowing Harrison's SG, Lennon recorded a lead guitar solo.

After the band finished adding overdubs, Martin and Emerick mixed the song for mono twice. While the Beatles would often ad lib offhandedly at the end of recordings, their other songs faded out before this became audible. Martin and Emerick decided to instead leave the dog barks, shouts and screams in the final recording, at one point adding heavy compression to some of Lennon's dialogue and dog noises. They raised the song in pitch slightly, running the playback fast. With the mono version intended for use in the animated film, Emerick returned to Studio Three on 29 October 1968 to mix the song for stereo, this version being included on the original soundtrack LP.

Release 

Apple released Yellow Submarine in the US on 13 January 1969, with "Hey Bulldog" sequenced as the fourth track, between "All Together Now" and "It's All Too Much". Release in the UK followed four days later. Emerick praised McCartney's bass playing on the recording, describing it as his most inventive since that of Sgt. Pepper's Lonely Hearts Club Band.

During these sessions, a film crew photographed the Beatles recording the song at EMI's Abbey Road studios for a promotional film to be released during their scheduled four-month retreat to India (which was later edited together as a promotional film for the single "Lady Madonna").

The song was used in a segment of the animated film Yellow Submarine. Initially, it appeared only in some European theatrical prints. It was cut from the American version by the movie's producer Al Brodax as he and the group felt the film was too long. It was restored for the film's 1999 re-release. To promote the reissue, Apple went back to the original footage shot for the "Lady Madonna" promo film and restructured it for use as a promotional clip for "Hey Bulldog" (as it is possible to identify what they were playing, and therefore possible to synchronise the music with the original footage). The 1999 clip was included in the three-disc versions (titled 1+) of the Beatles' 2015 video compilation 1.

Personnel 

According to Walter Everett, except where noted:

 John Lennon double tracked vocals, piano, lead guitar
 Paul McCartney harmony vocal, bass, tambourine
 George Harrison guitar
 Ringo Starr drums

Accolades
In 2018, the music staff of Time Out London ranked "Hey Bulldog" at number 28 on their list of the best Beatles songs. Rolling Stone ranked the song at number 81 in its list of the 100 best Beatles songs.

Notes

References

Citations

Sources

External links

The Beatles songs
Song recordings produced by George Martin
Songs written by Lennon–McCartney
The Beatles' Yellow Submarine
Songs published by Northern Songs
British psychedelic rock songs
1969 songs
Songs about dogs
British hard rock songs